Richmond, population 3,232 (2016), is a town nestled amidst rolling farmlands on the Saint-François River between Sherbrooke and Drummondville, in the heart of Estrie in Quebec, Canada.

History

Originally settled by colonists from New England, Montreal and the Richelieu River valley circa 1798, Richmond is one of the oldest settlements in the former region of the Eastern Townships.

Richmond grew in importance during the 1800s when it became a key railway junction. The St. Lawrence and Atlantic Railroad opened between Montreal and Portland, Maine, on April 4, 1853 and was purchased four months later and absorbed into the Grand Trunk Railway (GTR)'s system. Two years later, the GTR opened a line from the mainline in Richmond northeast to Lévis to connect Montreal with Quebec City. The line was eventually extended further east to Rivière-du-Loup and a connection with the Intercolonial Railway, which operated trains on the GTR through Richmond to Montreal until 1897.

The town itself was first called Richmond in 1820, when a post office was inaugurated. By the 1860s Richmond was an important centre, with a college, literary institute and a public library.

Richmond's importance has waned since the 1930s, however, as the railways have also come to play a lesser role in the economy. The GTR was absorbed into the Canadian National Railways (CNR) and the line to Levis was abandoned in favour of more direct lines from Montreal to Quebec City. In 1989, CNR sold the entire railway line from Montreal to Portland, via Richmond, to a short line operator.

Richmond today
Richmond as it exists today was created on December 29, 1999 following the merger of the "old" town of Richmond on the right bank of the Saint-François and the village of Melbourne, located on the other side.

Origin of the name Richmond
The name Richmond is in memory of Charles Lennox, 4th Duke of Richmond and Lennox (1764–1819), Governor General of Upper Canada from 1818 to 1819.

Origin of the name Melbourne
The origin of the name Melbourne is uncertain, but the village is believed to have been named for Melbourne, Derbyshire or Melbourne, Hampshire.

Climate
Richmond has a humid continental climate typical of southern Quebec. Precipitation is high year-round, resulting in warm to hot, humid summers and cold, snowy winters.

Demographics 

Mother tongue (2011)

Notable residents
Joseph Bédard (October 23, 1835 – May 4, 1912), merchant and political figure in Quebec.
Sylvain Lefebvre (born October 14, 1967), former ice hockey defenceman who played on five National Hockey League teams from 1989 to 2003
Walter George Mitchell (May 30, 1877 – April 3, 1935), Canadian lawyer and politician.
Peter Samuel George Mackenzie (1862-1914), lawyer and politician, Minister of Finance in the government of Quebec 
Mack Sennett, Hollywood director/pioneer
Yvon Vallières, politician and teacher

Particularities
 The reverse side of the 1954-series Canadian $2 bill featured a view of the village of Melbourne.
 Richmond plays host to the second largest St. Patrick's Day Parade in the province of Quebec, behind only Montreal.

See also
List of cities in Quebec

References

Cities and towns in Quebec
Incorporated places in Estrie
Hudson's Bay Company trading posts